In numerical analysis, a branch of applied mathematics, the midpoint method is a one-step method for numerically solving the differential equation,

The explicit midpoint method is given by the formula

the implicit midpoint method by

Note that the modified Euler method can refer to Heun's method, for further clarity see List of Runge–Kutta methods.

A geometric interpretation may give a better intuitive understanding of the method (see figure at right). The next value  is found where the tangent intersects the vertical line . The diagram illustrates that the tangent at the midpoint (upper, green line segment) would most likely give a more accurate approximation of the curve in that interval. However, this midpoint tangent could not be accurately calculated because we do not know the curve (that is what is to be calculated). This last step is represented by the red chord in the diagram.

The local error at each step of the midpoint method is of order , giving a global error of order .

The methods are examples of a class of higher-order methods known as Runge–Kutta methods.

Derivation of the midpoint method

The midpoint method is a refinement of the Euler's method

and is derived in a similar manner. 
The key to deriving Euler's method is the approximate equality

which is obtained from the slope formula

and keeping in mind that 

For the midpoint methods, one replaces (3) with the more accurate

when instead of (2) we find

The solution is then to use a Taylor series expansion exactly as if using the Euler method to solve for : 

which, when plugged in (4), gives us

and the explicit midpoint method (1e).

and thus
 
Inserting the approximation  for 
results in the implicit Runge-Kutta method

which contains the implicit Euler method with step size  as its first part.

Because of the time symmetry of the implicit method, all
Replacing the implicit with the explicit Euler method in the determination of  results again in the explicit midpoint method.

See also
 Rectangle method
 Heun's method
 Leapfrog integration and Verlet integration

Notes

References

 
 .
 

Numerical differential equations
Runge–Kutta methods